Ilija Zavišić (Serbian Cyrillic: Илија Завишић; born 10 January 1952) is a former Yugoslav professional footballer who played as a midfielder.

After retiring from the game, Zavišić worked in Partizan's youth setup. His younger son, Bojan, also played for the Crno-beli.

Honours
Partizan
 Yugoslav First League: 1975–76, 1977–78

References

External links
 
 
 
 

1952 births
Living people
2. Bundesliga players
Association football midfielders
Bundesliga players
Expatriate footballers in Germany
FK Bor players
FK Partizan non-playing staff
FK Partizan players
Eintracht Braunschweig players
FK Rad players
People from Majdanpek
Serbian footballers
Yugoslav expatriate footballers
Yugoslav expatriate sportspeople in Germany
Yugoslav First League players
Yugoslav footballers
Yugoslavia international footballers